Naifaru is an island in the Maldives  north of the capital, Malé. It is the capital and most populous island of Lhaviyani Atoll.

History
According to local historian late Ali Hussain, Naifaru has been inhabited for more than 400 years. He concluded this based on some evidences he observed. among these are:
 lack of evidence of Naifaru being a big town historically, like the abandoned cemeteries, foundations and rocky mounds of the buried stupas from the Buddhist era like of which we find in some other islands of the atoll like Maafilaafushi, Dhiffushimaidhoo. And lack of any record which mention Naifaru being a populated place historically.
 Written record of a political prisoner named Hussain Velaanaa Thakurufaanu (Hussain Shah Bandhar) being banished to Naifaru in 1116 AH (1704–1705 CE). Since political prisoners are banished to islands with small populations, Ali Hussain concludes it must not have been very long since Naifaru was inhabited.
 Written record of the endowment of Raafushi Island to Naifaru Kuda Miskiy (small mosque) in 1197 AH (1783 CE). Ali Hussain estimates it would take about two centuries for an island to populate enough to have an endowment be registered to its mosque.
 Observed dates from local cemetery tombstones which goes back to 12th century AH (17th century CE)
 A huge tombstone which was erected to the west of Hukuru Miskiy (Friday Mosque); according to local oral tradition it belonged to a martyr of the Battle of Dhonakulhi which took place in 1167 AH (1753 CE)

Looking at all these evidences, Ali Hussain concludes Naifaru was inhabited at around 1000 AH (1591 CE).

Ali Hussain also saw a written document which says that when islands like Dhiffushimaidhoo and Huruvalhi were inhabited islands, Naifaru and Madivaru were uninhabited islands leased to a citizen of Huruvalhi. He had employed a group of people from Raa Atoll Kothaafaru to get toddy from palm trees of Naifaru and Madivaru. When a fight broke out in Huruvalhi, he came to Naifaru with his family and inhabited it. Ali Hussain says, he neither accepts this narration nor rejects it.

Geography 
Naifaru is at 5.4444°′ north latitude and 73.3657°′ east longitude.

Demography

In 1931, Naifaru had a population of around 1800; in 1979 it has increased to 2810.

As of the 2006 census, Naifaru had population of 3687, contributing 1.23% of total population of the country. Compared to the 2000 census, Naifaru had a slightly negative population growth (-0.09%). This negative change is due to emigration to the Capital. As of 31 December 2008, Naifaru had a registered population of 4720. As of 31 May 2013 it has increased to 5082. The population as of August 2017 stands at 5408.

In the latest census conducted in 2014, Naifaru recorded a residing population of 4141 people. this includes 3844 Maldivians and 297 foreigners.

Naifaru is the 6th most populous town in the Maldives after Malé, Addu City, Fuvahmulah, Kulhudhuffushi, and Thinadhoo.

Governance

Municipal Council

Secretariat of the Naifaru Council

Economy

Fishing
Fishing has been the major income generator for the islanders since the beginning. The location of the first tuna canning factory in the Maldives was selected to be the nearby island of Felivaru due to the high number of catch by Naifarians. Fishing is still a major income generator for the island, although working in resort islands has gained popularity among the youth in the last few years.

Retail business
Naifaru has more than 120 shops and markets that serve the island population as well the atoll population. These include hardware stores, food and consumer product stores, electronic shops, building materials, fabric stores, boutiques and automobile showrooms.

Guest houses
There are two guest houses in operation in Naifaru, and more are being built.

Transportation
There are two passenger boats operating between Naifaru and the capital Male; it takes about nine hours on the sea in order to reach the destination. A passenger boat from Dhaalu atoll travels between Naifaru and Male.

Healthcare

Lhaviyani Atoll Hospital (LHAH) is the only Medical facility in Naifaru. It is the state level Hospital of Faadhippolhu and so people from Naifaru, people from neighbor islands, and people from neighboring atolls visit it for medical procedures.

Education

Secondary and primary education

Madhrasathul Ifthithaah is the second oldest education institute in the country. It was inaugurated in the year 1933 by the Naifaru born renown scholar and Supreme Judge Abdullah Fahmi Didi (Jalaluddin). It teaches students from LKG, UKG, Grade 1 up to grade 12. Students of grade 10 do the Cambridge O' levels and after finishing grade 12 they sit in London Ed Excel Advance Level examinations. Students from Madhrasathul Ifthithaah have scored good grades in the National Top Ten in the O' Levels and A Levels. The school population is more than 1000.

Preschool
Until 2016, Naifaru had three preschools; Nooraanee Preschool (NPS), Roashanee Preschool (RPS) and Lifelong Learning Preschool (LLP). NPS and RPS were managed by the local council while LLP was a private school. NPS and RPS are the oldest preschools in the Maldives. Nooraanee Preschool was opened in 1947.
In 2017 the name of Roashanee Preschool changed to Iqra International Preschool and the school is now very different.

References

Populated places in the Maldives
Islands of the Maldives